Reefton Power Station supplied electricity to the very prosperous gold mining town of Reefton in New Zealand and was the first power station to supply municipal electricity in the Southern Hemisphere.<ref name="NZHA88">New Zealand Historical Atlas – McKinnon, Malcolm (Editor); David Bateman, 1997, Plate 88</ref> It started operation on 4 August 1888.

Reefton man George Rich Wylde (1858-1942), son of James Wylde, 
brought samples of Edison and Swan electric lamps back from a visit to Victoria, Australia returning on 8 January 1883 and a public meeting was called to consider an electricity generating and distribution enterprise for Reefton. Ross & Glendinning had been lighting one of their Dunedin factories with electricity since 1882.

The Reefton Electric Light and Power Company was formed in 1886. The decision to build a power station was taken in the same year, following a demonstration of electric lighting in four Reefton hotels. The demonstration was organised by amateur electrician Walter Prince.

The power station turbine was run by water supplied from the Inangahua River via two tunnels and a headrace flume. The Grey Electric Power Board purchased the scheme in 1946. After the town was connected to the national grid in 1949 the power station was decommissioned. Since the Reefton system used 220 volts direct current while the national grid used 230 volts 50 hertz alternating current, a motor–generator was installed at the power station site to supply customers until rewiring was completed. The power house was demolished in 1961.

The Reefton Power Station was recognised by Heritage New Zealand as a Category 2 Historic Place on the 30th August 1990 (List no. 5002).

Parts of the original structure remain and are accessible via a walking track, and there are plans for restoration of the site. A Trust was formed in 2012 with the goal of restoring the historic powerplant. Stage 1 of this planned restoration was completed on April 11, 2015. This included new signage, riverbank preservation and walking track restoration.

In September 2020 a new 4 tonne turbine costing $800,000 was delivered as part of a $5M restoration project.

See also

Electricity sector in New Zealand
List of power stations in New Zealand

References

Further reading 
 Aspden, Rob (1987) Reefton 1986 - centenary of the formation of the first electric supply company in NZ. New Zealand engineering'', v.42 n.2:p.11

Energy infrastructure completed in 1888
Hydroelectric power stations in New Zealand
Buildings and structures in the West Coast, New Zealand
Reefton
1888 in New Zealand